Presque Isle Harbor is an unincorporated community and census-designated place (CDP) in Presque Isle County in the U.S. state of Michigan. Its population was 600 as of the 2010 census.  The CDP is located along the shores of Lake Huron within Presque Isle Township.

History
The community of Presque Isle Harbor was listed as a newly-organized census-designated place for the 2010 census, meaning it now has officially defined boundaries and population statistics for the first time.

Geography

Demographics

References

Unincorporated communities in Presque Isle County, Michigan
Unincorporated communities in Michigan
Census-designated places in Presque Isle County, Michigan
Census-designated places in Michigan
Populated places on Lake Huron in the United States